Walter Leonard Bragg (8 July 1929 – 6 March 2016) was an English professional footballer who played as a centre half in the Football League for Brentford. At the time of his debut in March 1947, he was Brentford's then-youngest first team debutant.

Career 
An amateur centre half, Bragg joined First Division club Brentford in early 1946 from local team Twickenham Celtic. After a spell out on loan at Corinthian League club Hounslow Town, he turned professional in January 1947. He made his debut at outside right, in place of Idris Hopkins for the visit of Grimsby Town on 29 March 1947 and his appearance in the 1–0 defeat made him Brentford's youngest debutant at that time. A call-up for national service saw him fail to appear again until the second half of the 1951–52 Second Division season, when he enjoyed a run of 10 appearances. He then went on to become a regular fixture in the team through the mid-1950s and made a career-high 44 appearances during a disastrous 1953–54 season, in which the Bees were relegated to the Third Division South. Bragg played on until the end of the 1956–57 season, when he retired from football after a succession of injuries. He was posthumously inducted into the club's Hall of Fame in May 2018.

Personal life 
Prior to becoming a professional footballer, Bragg worked as a linotype operator for a printing firm in Richmond. He served his national service in the RAF. After retiring from football, he worked as an advertising manager for local newspapers in Twickenham. He was married with a son and two daughters and five grandchildren and at the time of his death in March 2016.

Honours 

 Brentford Hall of Fame

Career statistics

References

External links
 

1929 births
2016 deaths
English footballers
English Football League players
Brentford F.C. players
Hounslow F.C. players
20th-century Royal Air Force personnel
Footballers from Twickenham
Royal Air Force airmen
Association football central defenders